Clément Billemaz (born 22 September 1998) is a French professional footballer who plays as a winger for Annecy.

Career
Billemaz is a youth product of Villefranche, and began his senior career with them in 2015. He shortly after joined Dijon, where he played in the reserves for 3 years. In 2019, he moved to Louhans-Cuiseaux in the Championnat National 2. He transferred to the newly promoted side Annecy on 25 May 2022. He debuted with Annecy in a 2–1 loss in the Ligue 2 to Niort on 30 July 2022.

References

External links
 
 

1998 births
Living people
Footballers from Lyon
French footballers
FC Villefranche Beaujolais players
Dijon FCO players
Louhans-Cuiseaux FC players
FC Annecy players
Ligue 2 players
Championnat National players
Championnat National 3 players
Association football wingers